Nowy Jaromierz  is a village in the administrative district of Gmina Kargowa, within Zielona Góra County, Lubusz Voivodeship, in western Poland. It has an area of approximately 2 km²

The village has a population of 73 as of 2011, with 35 men and 38 women.

References

Nowy Jaromierz